Hermann Feierabend (1925–1995) was a Swiss painter.

References
This article was initially translated from the German Wikipedia.

20th-century Swiss painters
Swiss male painters
1928 births
1995 deaths
20th-century Swiss male artists